Salon is a town and nagar panchayat in Raebareli district in the Indian state of Uttar Pradesh. It serves as the headquarters of a tehsil as well as a community development block. Originally it was also the headquarters of the entire district, but they were moved after the Indian Rebellion of 1857. It is located a bit to the south of the Sai river, at the junction of the Raebareli-Pratapgarh and Jais-Khaga roads. Other roads lead to Dalmau, Manikpur, and Kunda. To the east is a large jhil.

It has an average elevation of 110 metres (360 feet).

As of 2011, Salon has a population of 14,757, in 2,130 households.

History
According to legend, Salon was founded by Salivahan, the ancestor of the Bais. It was under Bhar rule for a long time, but although they were driven out by the Muslims after the murder of two Sayyids passing through, the Muslims did not make much headway here until the late 1700s, during the reign of Asaf-ud-Daula. Under the Nawabs of Awadh, Salon was the headquarters of a chakla and had a garrison of 350 soldiers, 50 of whom were stationed in the faujdars mud fort on the south side of town.

Around 1800, Salon was a prosperous town, but it declined by the end of the 19th century. After the British annexed Awadh in 1856, Salon was originally chosen to be the district headquarters, but it lost that status after the 1857 uprising. It was then put under Pratapgarh district as a tehsil headquarters, and finally transferred under Raebareli district in 1869.

At the turn of the 20th century, Salon was described as a small but historic town, "surrounded by groves and clumps of palm trees" and possessing a locally important bazar called Fazalganj, which held markets twice per week. The tehsil headquarters were also located in town, along with a police station, post office, cattle pound, and large middle vernacular school. Its population as of 1901 was 5,170 people, including 2,954 Muslims.

Demographics

As of the 2001 Census of India, Salon had a population of 13,166. Males constitute 51.30% of the population and females 48.70%. Salon has an average literacy rate of 49.54%. In Salon, 17% of the population is under 6 years of age.

According to the 2011 census, Salon has a population of 14,757 people, in 2,130 households. The town's sex ratio is 973 females to every 1000 males, which is the highest among towns in Raebareli district; 7,479 of Salon's residents are male (50.7%) and 7,278 are female (49.3%). The 0-6 age group makes up about 14.0% of the town's population; the sex ratio for this group is 968, which is higher than the district urban average for this group. Members of Scheduled Castes make up 6.78% of the town's population, while members of Scheduled Tribes make up 0.01%. Salon's literacy rate was 74.34% (counting only people age 7 and up); literacy was higher among men and boys (80.29%) than among women and girls (68.24%). The scheduled castes literacy rate is 58.25% (65.88% among men and boys, and 50.25% among women and girls).

In terms of employment, 17.43% of Salon residents were classified as main workers (i.e. people employed for at least 6 months per year) in 2011. Marginal workers (i.e. people employed for less than 6 months per year) made up 9.07%, and the remaining 73.50% were non-workers. Employment status varied significantly according to gender, with 45.22% of men being either main or marginal workers, compared to only 7.25% of women.

51.03% of Salon residents live in slum conditions as of 2011. There are 6 slum areas in Salon: Mikayana East, Gorhi, Paighambarpur West, Nai Bazar, Kachchi Masjid, and Miyan Sahab Ka Pathak (the largest). These range in size from about 135 to 240 households and have between 29 and 131 tap water access points. The number of toilets installed in people's homes ranges from 35 in Paighambarpur West to 125 in Nai Bazar. All 6 areas are serviced by open sewers, as is the rest of the city.

Villages
Salon CD block has the following 134 villages:

Notable person 
 Deenanath Sewak (Ex. M.L.A. 1974-1980)

References

Cities and towns in Raebareli district